Aleksandar Kukolj (born 9 September 1991) is a Serbian judoka. He won the Grand Slam of Abu Dhabi in 2016. In 2016 he took the victory at the Grand Slam in Tokyo. Kukolj started with bronze in 2016 in Havana and silver at the Grand Prix in Baku and silver the Grand Prix Samsun in 2015 and Zagreb in 2014. Kukolj won World Cups in Lisbon in 2012 and won the Panam Open in San Salvador in 2014 & Mediterranean Games in 2013. He won European bronze as Junior and U23.
He competed at the 2016 Summer Olympics in Rio de Janeiro, in the men's 90 kg.

Achievements
2017
  European Judo Championships – 20–23 April, Warsaw, Poland – –90 kg 
  Grand Prix Antalya – 7–9 April, Antalya, Turkey – –90 kg
2016
  Grand Slam Tokyo – 2–4 December, Tokyo, Japan – –90 kg
  Grand Slam Abu Dhabi – 28–30 October, Abu Dhabi, United Arab Emirates – –90 kg
  Grand Slam Baku – 6–8 May, Baku, Azerbaijan – –90 kg
  Grand Prix Havana – 22–24 June, Havana, Cuba – –90 kg
2015
  Grand Prix Samsun – 27–29 March, Samsun, Turkey – –90 kg
2014
  Grand Prix Zagreb – 12–14 September, Zagreb, Croatia – –90 kg
  Panamerican Open San Salvador – 14–15 June, San Salvador, El Salvador – –90 kg
  European Open Prague – 1–2 March, Prague, Czech Republic – –90 kg
  European Open Sofia – 1–2 February, Sofia, Bulgaria – –90 kg
2013
  European Open Budapest – 16–17 February, Budapest, Hungary – –90 kg
2012
  World Cup Rome – 29–30 September, Rome, Italy – –90 kg
  World Cup Lisbon – 9–10 June, Lisbon, Portugal  – –90 kg

References

External links
 
 
 

1991 births
Living people
Serbian male judoka
Olympic judoka of Serbia
Judoka at the 2016 Summer Olympics
European champions for Serbia
European Games competitors for Serbia
Serbs of Bosnia and Herzegovina
Sportspeople from Prague
Mediterranean Games gold medalists for Serbia
Mediterranean Games medalists in judo
Competitors at the 2013 Mediterranean Games
Judoka at the 2015 European Games
Judoka at the 2019 European Games
Judoka at the 2020 Summer Olympics
21st-century Serbian people